Orthomiella is a genus of butterflies in the family Lycaenidae. The species of this genus are found in the Indomalayan realm and Yunnan in the Palearctic realm.

Species
Orthomiella pontis
Orthomiella rantaizana Wileman, 1910 Taiwan,Thailand, Burma, Laos, Vietnam
Orthomiella sinensis (Elwes, 1887) China, Burma

External links

"Orthomiella de Nicéville in Marshall & de Nicéville, 1890" at Markku Savela's Lepidoptera and some other life forms

Polyommatini
Lycaenidae genera
Taxa named by Lionel de Nicéville